Dhanu may refer to:
 Dhanu (festival), a Hindu religious festival associated with the Dhanu jatra
 Dhanu (month), a month in the Hindu calendar
 Dhanu, the assassin of Rajiv Gandhi
 Dhanu River, a river in Bangladesh
 Dhanu Rosadhe (born 1989), Indonesian footballer
 Dhanus (disambiguation), several entities in ancient Indian culture

See also 
 Dhaŋu, an Australian Aboriginal Yolŋu language
 Dahanu, a town in Maharashtra, India